Katsumasa Miyamoto (born 28 August 1972) is a Japanese professional golfer.

Miyamoto was born in Shizuoka Prefecture. After turning professional, he joined the Japan Golf Tour, where he has won 12 times. He won his first title in 1998, adding another later that year. He added two more wins in 2001 and 2014 and one win in 2003, 2007, 2008, 2010, 2017 and 2019.

Professional wins (13)

Japan Golf Tour wins (12)

Japan Golf Tour playoff record (2–3)

Other wins (1)
2008 Hitachi 3Tours Championship

Results in major championships

Note: Miyamoto only played in The Open Championship.
CUT = missed the half-way cut

Results in World Golf Championships

"T" = Tied

Team appearances
Amateur
Eisenhower Trophy (representing Japan): 1992, 1994

Professional
Alfred Dunhill Cup (representing Japan): 1998
Dynasty Cup (representing Japan): 2003, 2005

See also
1998 PGA Tour Qualifying School graduates
List of golfers with most Japan Golf Tour wins

References

External links

Japanese male golfers
Japan Golf Tour golfers
Sportspeople from Shizuoka Prefecture
1972 births
Living people